The NWA Alabama Heavyweight Championship was created in October, 1962. Since its creation, the championship has been defended in a number of NWA territories throughout the decades.

Initially, the title was a part of Gulf Coast Championship Wrestling (GCCW) and later Southeastern Championship Wrestling (SECW), which became Continental Championship Wrestling (CCW) in 1985. It is unclear exactly when the championship moved to SCW/CCW, however it was sometime between December 1977 and November 1980. The title stayed there until CCW left the NWA to join the American Wrestling Association (AWA) in 1988.

The championship was then shortly picked up by Alabama Pro Wrestling (APW - now NWA Xtreme) as its major title in May 2001. The title then became again inactive in November 2002, when APW created its own Heavyweight Championship.

Title history

See also
National Wrestling Alliance
Southeastern/Continental Championship Wrestling

External links
Wrestling-Titles.com

References

National Wrestling Alliance championships
National Wrestling Alliance state wrestling championships
Professional wrestling in Alabama